Polishchuk is a Ukrainian-language toponymic surname associated with Polissya and the Polishchuk people, who live along the Ukrainian-Belarus border. The Russian-language equivalent is Poleshchuk.

The surname may refer to:

 Anatoliy Polishchuk, Ukrainian volleyball player
 Daniel Poleshchuk (born 1996), Israeli squash player
 Fedor Polishchuk
 Dmitry Polishchuk, Russian windsurfer
 Lyubov Polishchuk 
 Mikhail Polischuk
 Sofia Polishchuk
 Victor Polishchuk
 Yuliya Polishchuk

See also
 
Poleshchuk (surname)
Palaszczuk (surname)
Wiktor Poliszczuk

Ukrainian-language surnames
Surnames of Ukrainian origin